Sharon Elmar Sims  (born 24 May 1952) is a New Zealand lawn bowls international.

Bowls career
At the 2002 Commonwealth Games she won a gold medal along with Jo Edwards in the women's pairs event. At the World Bowls Championships in 2000 she was a triples and fours champion, and in 2004 a pairs champion. 

She won eight medals at the Asia Pacific Bowls Championships, four of which have been gold medals.

Sims won the 2002 & 2005 singles title and the 1993, 2006, 2007 & 2009 pairs title at the New Zealand National Bowls Championships when bowling for the Hamilton Bowls Club.

Honours and awards
In the 2007 Queen’s Birthday Honours, Sims was appointed a Member of the New Zealand Order of Merit, for services to lawn bowls. In 2013, she was an inaugural inductee into the Bowls New Zealand Hall of Fame.

References

Living people
1952 births
New Zealand female bowls players
Commonwealth Games gold medallists for New Zealand
Bowls players at the 1998 Commonwealth Games
Bowls players at the 2002 Commonwealth Games
Bowls players at the 2006 Commonwealth Games
Members of the New Zealand Order of Merit
Bowls World Champions
People from Te Kōpuru
Commonwealth Games medallists in lawn bowls
Medallists at the 2002 Commonwealth Games